Europe is the second full-length album from the London indie pop group Allo Darlin'. The album was released in May 2012 by Fortuna Pop! in the United Kingdom and Slumberland Records in the United States.

Reception

At Metacritic, which assigns a weighted average rating out of 100 to reviews from mainstream critics, Europe received an average score of 82, which indicates "universal acclaim", based on reviews from 18 critics. Europe was also tallied by Metacritic as the 32nd best reviewed album of 2012 by the end of the year by mainstream critics.

The album was listed at number 42 on Rolling Stones list of the top 50 albums of 2012.

Track listing
 "Neil Armstrong" – 3:34
 "Capricornia" – 4:31
 "Europe" – 3:55
 "Some People Say" – 3:43
 "Northern Lights" – 3:06
 "Wonderland" – 3:34
 "Tallulah" – 4:48
 "The Letter" – 4:03
 "Still Young" – 4:52
 "My Sweet Friend" – 3:49

Personnel
 Elizabeth Morris – guitar, ukulele, vocals
 Michael Collins – drums, vocals
 Paul Rains – guitar, lap steel guitar, vocals
 Bill Botting – bass, vocals

References

2012 albums
Allo Darlin' albums
Slumberland Records albums
Fortuna Pop! Records albums